Bhani Devi Goyal Saraswati Vidhya Mandir Inter College is a Secondary and Higher Secondary boys School located in Jhansi, Uttar Pradesh, India.

School campus
This school is located at Balaji Road, Jhansi and has a wide campus about 12 acres of land. It has a physics building, chemistry, biology and computer laboratories, library and reading hall with modern technology. There are many sports facilities are available. It has also its own hostel "Bhardwaj Chhatrawas" which can accommodate up to 200 students.

Facilities
There are so many facilities for students which includes sports, transport, health checkup, purified RO water, dance classes, spoken English classes

References

Boys' schools in India
High schools and secondary schools in Uttar Pradesh
Intermediate colleges in Uttar Pradesh
Education in Jhansi